The Grote Markt (Dutch, Aalsters: Groeite Mert; meaning "Big Market") is the central square of Aalst, East Flanders, Belgium. The Aldermen's House, the Town Hall, the Beurs van Amsterdam, Herberg Graaf van Egmont and the Belfry/Schepenhuis are located there.

The large square is broken by the protruding position of the Aldermen's House and the Herberg Graaf van Egmont, and is partly divided into several parts. The square behind the Aldermen's House (on Kattestraat) and the connecting street to Hopmarkt and Nieuwstraat are also referred to as part of the Grote Markt. The statue of printer Dirk Martens is also located on the square.

The Grote Markt witnessed many tragic events unfold during its history. In 1524, the first female Protestant martyr Clara 't Roen was executed on the square. More than two centuries later, in 1748, the outlaw and gang leader Jan de Lichte suffered the same faith.

Events hosted on the square

 Every year, the Grote Markt is the main meeting place for the Carnival of Aalst. In 2022, when Carnival was not organised by the city due to the COVID-19 pandemic in Belgium, local Carnival-goers met up there to celebrate. Since 2022, the market square has functioned as the location to announce the winner of Prince Carnival. The traditional "doll burning" and "onion throw" are also held on the square.
 The Grote Markt is also used to host concerts, often on the Day of the Flemish Community.
 De Catharinisten, a 600 year old theatrical troupe, celebrated their 600th birthday on the Grote Markt.

Gallery

References

Notes

Squares in Belgium
Streets in Aalst, Belgium
Tourist attractions in East Flanders